Liverpool Township is one of the eighteen townships of Columbiana County, Ohio, United States. As of the 2010 census the population was 4,047.

Geography
Located in the southeastern corner of the county along the Ohio River, it borders the following townships and borough:
St. Clair Township - north
Ohioville, Pennsylvania - east
Greene Township, Beaver County, Pennsylvania - southeast corner, across the Ohio River
Hancock County, West Virginia - south, across the Ohio River
Yellow Creek Township - southwest
Madison Township - northwest

One city and one CDP are located in Liverpool Township:
The city of East Liverpool, in the south
The census-designated place of La Croft, in the northwest

Name and history

Statewide, the only other Liverpool Township is located in Medina County.

The township was organized in 1834, the last in the county to be erected.

Government
The township is governed by a three-member board of trustees, who are elected in November of odd-numbered years to a four-year term beginning on the following January 1. Two are elected in the year after the presidential election and one is elected in the year before it. There is also an elected township fiscal officer, who serves a four-year term beginning on April 1 of the year after the election, which is held in November of the year before the presidential election. Vacancies in the fiscal officership or on the board of trustees are filled by the remaining trustees.

Township Trustees
Mike Bahen, Chairman
Dennis Giambroni, Vice Chairman
Keith H. Burke

Fiscal Officer
Shirley Flati

References

External links
County website

Townships in Columbiana County, Ohio
1834 establishments in Ohio
Populated places established in 1834
Townships in Ohio